Hugh McLeish (10 June 1948 – December 2004) was a Scottish professional footballer who played as a forward in the Football League for Luton Town and in the Scottish League for Berwick Rangers. He was on the books of Dundee United and Sunderland without appearing in the league for either, and also played for New Blackburn Athletic, Stevenage Town and Wimbledon.

References

1948 births
2004 deaths
Scottish footballers
Association football forwards
Dundee United F.C. players
Sunderland A.F.C. players
Luton Town F.C. players
Wimbledon F.C. players
Berwick Rangers F.C. players
English Football League players
Scottish Football League players